The Order of the Yellow Ribbon was founded in 1600 in Nevers by French-Italian nobleman Charles III, Duke of Nevers, nephew of the French king Henry III, and knights would be imposed very peculiar tasks.

Details and insignia 
They would have to practice the Italian game "la mara" (raising of even or odd numbers of fingers), to ride on a gray horse with red-dyed bridle and to share their goods. Ackermann writes that, according to some sources, partner exchange would also belong to the obligations of membership .

The French king forbade the Order soon after its founding. This remarkable chivalric order, one that could be perceived as a mockery of existing chivalric orders, is nevertheless included in the historical orders of France.

See also 
 Order of the Annunciation, founded in 1619 by Charles III, Duke of Nevers too.

Sources 
 Gustav Adolph Ackermann, " Ordensbuch, Sämtlicher in Europa blühender und erloschener Orden und Ehrenzeichen ". Annaberg, 1855

Yellow Ribbon